Events from the year 1778 in Denmark.

Incumbents
 Monarch – Christian VII
 Prime minister – Ove Høegh-Guldberg

Events
 4 September  Conrad Alexander Fabritius (1731–1805) and Michael Fabritius (1739–1815), as well as all legitimate children of their then-deceased father Michael Fabritius (1697-1746), are ennobled by letters patent under the name Fabritius de Tengnagel.

Undated

Culture

Theatre
 Johannes Ewald's opera The Death of Valder (written 1663) is performed for the first time.

Births
 1 March – Peter Christian Uldahl, piano maer (died 1820)
 20 April  Bendix Frantz Ludwig Schow, mayor (died 1839)
 21 December – Anders Sandøe Ørsted, jurist and politician, Prime Minister of Denmark (died 1860)

Deaths
 5 March – Hans Diderik Brinck-Seidelin, Supreme Court justice and landowner (born 1720)
 8 March – Jean Henri Desmercières, businessman (born 1687)
 Margrethe Marie Thomasine Numsen, court official (born 1705)

References

 
1770s in Denmark
Denmark
Years of the 18th century in Denmark